Wimbish is a village and civil parish within Uttlesford, in Essex, England. The first recorded mention of the village was in 1042, when it was referred to as Winebisc. It was subsequently referred to as Wimbeis in the Domesday Book. The village has its own non-denominational primary school (Wimbish Primary School) and a church (All Saints). The church tower was partly destroyed by lightning in 1756, and was rebuilt in brick but was later taken down again in 1883.

Governance
Wimbish is part of the electoral ward called Wimbish and Debden. The population of this ward at the 2011 census was 2,407.  Women in the ward had the third highest life expectancy at birth, 96.5 years, of any ward in England and Wales in 2016.

See also
 The Hundred Parishes

References

External links

Wimbish village website
Wimbish school website

Villages in Essex
Civil parishes in Essex
Uttlesford